John Duffy (born 1886) was an English professional footballer who played as a centre half.

Career
Duffy played for Workington, Bradford City, Exeter City, and Swansea Town.

For Bradford City he made one appearance in the Football League.

Sources

References

1886 births
Date of birth missing
People from Cleator Moor
English footballers
Association football defenders
Workington A.F.C. players
Bradford City A.F.C. players
Exeter City F.C. players
Swansea City A.F.C. players
English Football League players
Year of death missing
Place of death missing
Footballers from Cumbria